Pablo César Soto Soto (born 7 February 1995) is a Chilean footballer who plays for Deportes Colina as a goalkeeper.

Club career
He professionally debuted with the first adult team in a 3–2 Copa Chile defeat with Unión San Felipe on 3 June 2013.

Career statistics

References

External links
 

1995 births
Living people
People from Santiago
People from Santiago Province, Chile
People from Santiago Metropolitan Region
Footballers from Santiago
Chilean footballers
Colo-Colo B footballers
Colo-Colo footballers
Deportes Valdivia footballers
C.D. Arturo Fernández Vial footballers
Deportes Colina footballers
Segunda División Profesional de Chile players
Chilean Primera División players
Primera B de Chile players
Association football goalkeepers